William Joseph Lara (October 2, 1962 – May 29, 2021) was an American actor, martial artist, and musician, known for the role of Tarzan in the American TV series Tarzan: The Epic Adventures.

Career
Lara played Tarzan in the 1989 TV movie Tarzan in Manhattan and in the 1996-1997 follow-up TV series Tarzan: The Epic Adventures. He also appeared in numerous action films, including Steel Frontier and American Cyborg: Steel Warrior. He stopped acting after 20 years in 2002 to pursue a career in country music. At the peak of his career, Lara appeared in two action films, Armstrong and Warhead.

Personal life
In 2009, Lara became active in music.
He married Christian author and pastor Gwen Shamblin on August 18, 2018. He was also the father of one child with Natasha Pavlovich from their previous relationship. He lived in Brentwood, Tennessee.

Lara was a certified pilot holding multi-engine commercial and instrument ratings along with a type rating for the Cessna Citation I.

Death

On May 29, 2021, Lara died when a Cessna Citation I business jet registered to JL & GL Productions LP crashed into Percy Priest Lake near Smyrna. His wife, her son-in-law, and four members of Lara's church also died in the crash. The cause of the accident is under investigation by the National Transportation Safety Board. Reports in the immediate aftermath of the accident indicated that Lara's aviation medical certificate had expired in 2019, but Aviation International News and WSMV-TV subsequently found that Lara held a valid medical certificate when the crash occurred. While it was initially unclear who was flying the aircraft when it crashed, as another victim was a pilot although he lacked the required type rating to fly the Citation, the preliminary report by the National Transportation Safety Board stated, "The pilot held a commercial pilot certificate with ratings for airplane single-engine land, multiengine land, and instrument airplane." and "The pilot held a type rating for the airplane with no restrictions. His most recent Federal Aviation Administration (FAA) second-class medical certificate was issued on November 12, 2019, with the limitation that he 'must wear corrective lenses.'".  This information along with a CNN article on June 15, 2021, stating, "The pilot, who was among the seven killed, had a commercial pilot certificate and a private pilot certificate and had logged 1,680 total flight hours, 83 of those in the plane involved in the crash" has led some reports to conclude the pilot could only have been Lara.

Filmography

Film

Television

References

External links

1962 births
2021 deaths
Accidental deaths in Tennessee
American country singer-songwriters
American male film actors
American male television actors
Country musicians from California
Male actors from San Diego
Musicians from San Diego
Singer-songwriters from California
Victims of aviation accidents or incidents in the United States
Victims of aviation accidents or incidents in 2021
20th-century American male actors
21st-century American male actors
21st-century American male singers
21st-century American singers
American male singer-songwriters